Vlastimil Hajšman (26 February 1928 in Ledenice, Czechoslovakia – 3 March 1978 in České Budějovice, Czechoslovakia) was a Czech ice hockey player who competed in the 1952 Winter Olympics.

References

1928 births
1978 deaths
Czech ice hockey right wingers
Ice hockey players at the 1952 Winter Olympics
Olympic ice hockey players of Czechoslovakia
People from České Budějovice District
Motor České Budějovice players
Sportspeople from the South Bohemian Region
Czechoslovak ice hockey right wingers